Cortney Tidwell is an American singer-songwriter and multi-instrumentalist.

Personal life
Cortney Lara Tidwell was born on December 2, 1972, in Nashville, Tennessee to country singer Connie Eaton and Cliff Williamson, music producer at A&R. Her paternal grandfather Slim Williamson founded and operated renowned country music label Chart Records. Her maternal grandfather was Robert "Bob" Eaton. He was a member of the Grand Ole Opry in the 1950s and was signed to Decca records. In later years he was a frequent guest on The Ralph Emery Show and was known as "Roadmap Bob". Cortney made her television debut at age 5 on this program. As she sat on her mother's lap, Emery asked her who her favorite country performer was, to which she replied Conway Twitty and then sang "I'm Not Lisa" by Jessi Colter.

Most of Tidwell's family played at or was associated with The Grand Ole Opry. Her mother Connie was a celebrity in Nashville. She was friends with Jack Clement and spent a lot of time in his office on Music Row, writing songs and collaborating with other musicians such as Townes Van Zandt and Kris Kristofferson. She was also a dear friend of Shel Silverstein. Despite Connie's activity in the music scene, she steadily withdrew and spent most of her time at home by the mid 1980s. 

Connie was diagnosed with manic depression in the early 1970s, and Cortney and the family struggled to understand and cope with her mother's illness. Many in her family discouraged Cortney from pursuing music, but Cortney rejected this advice. Instead, she married and started a family while continuing to sing and play guitar.

Cortney's musical genes reemerged following the death of her mother. In 2004, Tidwell began recording with her husband, renowned producer and acclaimed recording engineer and musician Todd Tidwell manning the studio, often contributing his own playing and songwriting to his wife's songs.  A childhood friend Matthew Zarth, also an artist, believed in what Cortney And Todd were creating and offered to fund the first run of CDs on his label ‘SISSYBRAGG RECoRDs’ Cortney and her husband put together DIY copies at home and Nashville took notice. 
The Nashville scene consistently sang her praises and the late editor, Jim Ridley called her "Nashville’s real songbird" , She performed at Springwater with various musicians, but then began playing all the instruments herself at the same time due to raising the children and working
As a preschool teacher , this was the best she could do without a band. Nashville embraced the new setup and Cortney showed brilliant showmanship and determination on her own , a one woman band . She caught the attention of Lou Barlow of SebAdoh and opened a show for them to which turned into a courtship, pursuAnce from a very renowned underground Dance label k7 based in Berlin Germany.

To date, Cortney has released two full-length LPs and two EPs under her own name with City Slang records. In addition, she has also participated in a collaborative album of reimagined songs originally recorded for and released by her grandfather's Chart Records in the 1960s. featuring Kurt Wagner, William Tyler, and other members of Lambchop, under the name KORT.( also released on City Slang. She toured Europe extensiVery with her band, consisting of very renowned musicians including bassist Adam Bednarik, – Keyboard and guitarist Ryan Norris (lambchop, coupler, hands off Cuba) -Drummer Scott Martin ( lambchop, hands off Cuba, hobbledeions). -William Tyler ( lambchop, silver Jews  ) . Wyatt Mims, Aaron Thompson, Jim James also contributed.

Cortney and Todd have two sons, Elijah and Hunter, both of whom are revolutionary musicians in their own right. in their band called Jawws, Elijah proved himself at a young age as a dynamic performer and The Nashville Scene called him a cross between a young Ozzie and Henry Rollins, Hunter on drums with their friends who consistently drew praise from Nashville as being the new sons of punk.

Discography
Cortney Tidwell EP (2005, Sissybragg Records)
Don't Let Stars Keep Us Tangled Up (2007, Ever Records) 
featuring Kurt Wagner and William Tyler of Lambchop
Boys (2009, City Slang)
Includes "Oh, China," which features a traditional Chinese melody and (indistinct) English vocals
Invariable Heartache (2010, City Slang) with Kurt Wagner
Contains new versions of songs originally recorded for Chart Records
Clandestine (2012–2014, as yet unreleased)

External links

 Cortney Tidwell MySpace page
 Cortney Tidwell Bandcamp page
 MSNBC profile
 The Guardian profile
Pandora profile
Nashville Scene cover story on KORT
KORT Bandcamp page
 Copy Me: R. Stevie Moore Tribute 11 Bandcamp page
Featuring Tidwell's cover of R. Stevie Moore's 1978 song "I Go Into Your Mind"

Living people
American multi-instrumentalists
1972 births
Musicians from Nashville, Tennessee
Songwriters from Tennessee
Musicians from Tennessee
City Slang artists